Fania Esiah Mindell  (December 15, 1894July 18, 1969) was an American feminist, activist, and theater artist.


Life and career 

Mindell was born in Minsk, Russia on December 15, 1894. She emigrated to Brooklyn, New York in 1906 with her parents and family, and became a US citizen in 1919. She was an accomplished artist, and became a set and costume designer for Broadway theaters  in New York. She translated dramatic materials from Russian to English including her version of Maxim Gorky's play, "Night Lodging", which was performed at the Plymouth Theater in 1920. Edward G. Robinson was among the performers. Fania was also the proprietor of Little Russia, a small boutique in Greenwich Village, just off Washington Square which featured curios from Russia, but her true passion was for feminist and progressive causes. 

As a young political activist in 1916 she met the now famous feminist Margaret Sanger and her sister Ethel Byrne. Together, the three women opened the first birth control clinic in the United States in Brooklyn known as the "Brownsville Clinic" (after the Brownsville section of Brooklyn in which it was located). The clinic caused an immediate sensation in the press, getting national attention, and all three women were arrested and tried for "distributing obscene materials".

"The police monitored the Clinic from its opening and sent in a female undercover agent to purchase contraceptive supplies. On October 26 (1916) an undercover police woman and vice-squad officers raided the clinic, confiscated an assortment of contraceptives from pessaries to condoms, along with 20 'books on young women', and arrested Sanger, Byrne and Mindell. After being arraigned, Sanger and Mindell spent the night in the Raymond Street jail, Byrne at the Liberty Avenue station. All were released the next morning on $500.00 bail."

All three women were found guilty, but eventually the verdicts were overturned, and their campaign was ultimately successful, leading to major changes in social policy and to the laws governing birth control and sex education around the world. The clinic closed but later became the basis for what was to become known as Planned Parenthood.

On December 3, 1929 Fania married Ralph Edmund LeClercq Roeder, a scholar, historian, and author who shared her interest in drama and theater, and in leftist causes. The couple traveled extensively- in Europe, the Caribbean, and Haiti in the 1930s- but seem to have fallen in love with Mexico by the 1940s. Fania's brother, Jacob "Pop" Mindel, a dentist by profession, was a Communist Party member who was later prosecuted and jailed under the Smith Act. Her brother's views and her association with leftist causes may have influenced the Roeder's decision to move to Mexico by the 1950s when McCarthyism was prevalent in the United States.  During this period many political activists, artists and intellectuals from the United States sought refuge in Mexico.  Fania and her husband spent much of their later lives there as expatriates in Mexico City where  Ralph studied and authored a number of books including a seminal biography of Benito Juárez for which he was honored with Mexico's highest literary award, the Orden del Águila Azteca.

Fania and her husband both died in Mexico City in 1969Fania in July and her husband in October. Both are buried there in the city's Panteón de Dolores.

References 

20th-century translators
20th-century American women writers
1894 births
1969 deaths
American birth control activists
American Jews
American translators
American women's rights activists
People from Greenwich Village
People associated with Planned Parenthood
Sex educators
American socialist feminists
Emigrants from the Russian Empire to the United States